The Stranger from the Sky (Swedish: Främlingen från skyn) is a 1956 Swedish thriller film directed by Rolf Husberg and starring Marianne Bengtsson, Alf Kjellin and Georg Funkquist. It was shot at the Centrumateljéerna Studios in Stockholm. The film's sets were designed by the art director Nils Nilsson.

Synopsis
After a plane crash in Northern Sweden, a local girl believes she has seen a survivor in the woods but nobody else believes her.

Cast
 Marianne Bengtsson as Lo
 Alf Kjellin as 	Stig Hallman
 Günther Hüttmann as 	The Stranger
 Georg Funkquist as Erik Fridman
 Arne Källerud as 	Bror Eneflod
 Sif Ruud as 	Elin Lundgren 
 Lars Elldin as Björn Lundgren
 Gull Natorp as 	Actress
 Meg Westergren as 	Mrs. Wahlström, newlywed
 Gösta Prüzelius as 	Mr. Wahlström, newlywed couple
 David Stein as 	Scientist
 Herbert Curiel as 	Pilot 
 Helge Hagerman as 	Policeman
 Margit Andelius as Woman in the village 
 Astrid Bodin as 	Woman in the village 
 Tor Borong as 	Hermansson, local militia 
 Sven-Axel Carlsson as 	Kalle, local militia 
 Märta Dorff as 	Train passenger 
 Sune Elffors as 	Warder 
 Carl-Axel Elfving as Train passenger 
 Ivar Hallbäck as 	Constable 
 Birger Lensander as 	Worker 
 Carin Lundquist as 	Woman in the village 
 Wilma Malmlöf as 	Emma 
 Gösta Petersson as 	Doctor 
 Hanny Schedin as 	Mrs. Hermansson 
 Sture Ström as 	Policeman 
 Bengt Sundmark as 	Man 
 Allan Sundwall as 	Sandvik, policeman 
 Ivar Wahlgren as 	Constable 
 Birger Åsander as 	Ville, peasant

References

Bibliography 
 Qvist, Per Olov & von Bagh, Peter. Guide to the Cinema of Sweden and Finland. Greenwood Publishing Group, 2000.

External links 
 

1956 films
Swedish thriller films
1950s thriller films
1950s Swedish-language films
Films directed by Rolf Husberg
Swedish black-and-white films
1950s Swedish films